The fifteenth election to Cardiganshire County Council took place in March 1937. It was preceded by the 1934 election and, after those scheduled for 1940 and 1943 were postponed due to the Second World War, by the 1946 election.

Candidates
36 of the 50 councillors were returned unopposed and this resulted in fourteen contests, one fewer than three years previously Political affiliations did not feature in the election.

Retiring aldermen

Eight aldermen retired, of whom four sought election.

Contested elections

Following the fourteen contests, three retiring members (including one who withdrew too late to be removed from the ballot paper) were defeated while two retiring aldermen were defeated by incumbent councillors.

Outcome

Very little change took place as a result of an election in which only one sitting member lost his seat.

Results

Aberaeron

Aberbanc

Aberporth

Aberystwyth Division 1

Aberystwyth Division 2

Aberystwyth Division 3

Aberystwyth Division 4

Aberystwyth Division 5

Aberystwyth Division 6

Aeron
}

Borth

Bow Street

Cardigan North

Cardigan South

Cilcennin

Cwmrheidol

Devil's Bridge

Felinfach

Goginan

Lampeter Borough

Llanarth

Llanbadarn Fawr

Llanddewi Brefi

Llandygwydd

Llandysul North

Llandysul South

Llansysiliogogo

Llanfair Clydogau

Llanfarian

Llanfihangel y Creuddyn

Llangoedmor

Llangeitho

Llangrannog

Llanilar

Llanrhystyd

Llanllwchaiarn

Llansantffraed

Llanwnen

Llanwenog

Lledrod

Nantcwnlle

New Quay

Penbryn

Strata Florida

Taliesin

Talybont

Trefeurig

Tregaron

Troedyraur

Ysbyty Ystwyth

Election of Aldermen

In addition to the 50 councillors the council consisted of 16 county aldermen. Aldermen were elected by the council, and served a six-year term. Following the 1937 election, there were eight aldermanic vacancies which were filled at the annual meeting. There was some controversy due to the fact that the principle did seniority was not observed in the selection of aldermen. 
The following retiring aldermen were re-elected:
Sir D.C. Roberts, Aberystwyth
R.J.R. Loxdale, Llanilar
J.G. Morris Davies, Devil's Bridge
E.J. Davies, New Quay
W.E. Matthews, Cardigan
In addition, the following four new aldermen were elected:
David Evans, Troeduraur
Meredydd Ll.G. Williams, Llanwenog
Rev John Ellis Williams, Llanddewi Brefi
The following retiring aldermen had been re-elected as members of the council but were not re-elected as aldermen:
R.D. Herbert, Lledrod

The five re-elected aldermen had served at least two previous terms while Meredith Gwarnant Williams had been an alderman from 1922 until 1928.

By-elections
Five by-elections were held following the election of aldermen. Morgan Davies was returned unopposed at Llanddewi Brefi as was the incumbent councillor at Llanilar, James Isaac, who had stood down in favour of Alderman Loxdale. New members were elected for the three other divisions, including Devil's Bridge where the veteran member T. Mason Jones, who had returned to the council in 1934 after fifteen years absence did not stand due to ill health.

Devil's Bridge by-election

Llanddewi Brefi by-election

Llanilar by-election

Llanwenog by-election

Troedyraur by-election

References

Ceredigion County Council elections
Cardiganshire
20th century in Ceredigion